During his tenure as president of the United States (January 20, 2017 – January 20, 2021), Donald Trump granted executive clemency to 237 individuals charged or convicted of federal criminal offenses, using his clemency power under Article II, Section 2 of the Constitution. Ordinarily, all requests for executive clemency for federal offenses are directed to the Office of the Pardon Attorney (OPA) in the U.S. Department of Justice for review; however, Trump frequently bypassed the OPA, and the majority of his executive clemency grants were made to well-connected convicts who did not file a petition with the OPA or meet the OPA's requirements. Overall, Trump granted less clemency than any modern president.

Of the pardons and commutations that Trump did grant, the vast majority were to persons to whom Trump had a personal or political connection, or persons for whom executive clemency served a political goal. A significant number had been convicted of fraud or public corruption. The New York Times reported that during the closing days of the Trump presidency, individuals with access to the administration, such as former administration officials, were soliciting fees to lobby for presidential pardons.

Background

The U.S. president's power of clemency arises from Article II of the United States Constitution. Clemency "may take several forms, including pardon, commutation of sentence, remission of fine or restitution, and reprieve", with the two most commonly used forms being a pardon or commutation. A pardon is an official forgiveness for an acknowledged crime. Once a pardon is issued, all further punishment for the crime is waived. The president can only grant pardons for federal offenses. When the president commutes a sentence, it reduces the severity of a sentence without voiding the conviction itself; for example, a commutation may reduce or eliminate a prison term, while leaving other punishments intact. The power of clemency is "one of the most unlimited powers bestowed on the president by the Constitution."

Trump's use of executive clemency
For 125 years, the key adviser to the president on clemency has been the Department of Justice's Office of the Pardon Attorney (OPA) which normally reviews all requests for pardons. Trump often bypassed the OPA, and, unlike previous presidents, made the majority of his grants to executive clemency to "well-connected offenders who had not filed petitions with the pardon office or did not meet its requirements." Ultimately, of the 237 grants of clemency by Trump, only 25 came through the Office of the Pardon Attorney's process (which at the end of Trump's presidency had a backlog of 14,000 applications); the other clemency recipients came to Trump's attention through an ad hoc process at the Trump White House that benefited clemency applicants with money or connections to Trump allies, friends, and family members. Most of Trump's pardons and commutations were granted to people with personal or political connections to him.

Compared to other presidents, Trump granted clemency at low rates, with the bulk coming later in his term. Of Trump's grants of clemency, 84% were made in his last fiscal year in office, with 144 out of his 237 grants of clemency being granted on his last night in office; the list was "assembled so hastily that it contained inaccurate information about some cases."

Legal experts raised concerns that Trump was "relying on his personal connections rather than the Justice Department's established review process for finding convicts deserving of clemency." A late December 2020 analysis by Harvard Law School's Jack Goldsmith determined that "seven of the 94 Trump grants came on recommendation from the pardon attorney" and "at least 84 out of 94 Trump pardons had a personal or political connection to the president." On February 19, 2020, Vermont Senator Patrick Leahy requested information on the process used by Trump in deciding to grant clemency to 11 people the preceding day. In response to the criticism of his bypassing of the OPA, Trump said that he is the "chief law enforcement officer of the country."

Former Justice Department official and Mueller investigation prosecutor Andrew Weissmann noted that the language of Trump's pardons varied, ranging from a broad pardon of Michael Flynn to narrower pardons for several others, including Paul Manafort and Roger Stone, which Weissmann argued created "windows of opportunity" to prosecute individuals who had been narrowly pardoned.

Supporters and political allies

Trump's use of the pardon power was marked by an unprecedented degree of favoritism. He frequently granted executive clemency to his supporters or political allies, or following personal appeals or campaigns in conservative media, as in the cases of Rod Blagojevich, Michael Milken, Joe Arpaio, Dinesh D'Souza, and Clint Lorance, as well as Bernard Kerik. Trump granted clemency to five of his former campaign staff members and political advisers: Paul Manafort, Roger Stone, Michael Flynn, Stephen K. Bannon, and George Papadopoulos.

Many of Trump's grants of clemency were criticized by the federal agents and prosecutors who investigated and prosecuted the cases. Trump's grant of clemency to Stone in July 2020 marked the first time Trump granted clemency to a "figure directly connected to the president's campaign." Representatives Jerrold Nadler and Carolyn B. Maloney, who chair two House committees, said that "No other president has exercised the clemency power for such a patently personal and self-serving purpose" and said that they would investigate whether Stone's commutation was a reward for protecting Trump. Most Republican elected officials remained silent on Trump's commutation of Stone. Exceptions were Republican senators Mitt Romney, who termed the commutation "unprecedented, historic corruption," and Pat Toomey, who called the commutation a "mistake" due in part to the severity of the crimes of which Stone was convicted.

Requests by celebrities

In 2018, following a request by celebrity Kim Kardashian, Trump commuted the life sentence of Alice Marie Johnson who had been convicted of drug trafficking. In August 2020, he pardoned Johnson after she had praised his leadership in a campaign video at the 2020 Republican National Convention.

Military personnel accused or convicted of war crimes

Trump granted executive clemency to three court-martialed U.S. military officers who were accused or convicted of war crimes in Iraq and Afghanistan. Trump granted the pardons against the advice of senior military and Defense Department leadership, as well as U.S. military lawyers. Critics state that Trump's pardons of the officers undermined military discipline, constituted an inappropriate interference in the U.S. military justice system, and called into question the U.S. commitment to the law of armed conflict. Tensions between Trump and the Defense Department regarding Trump's interventions in the military justice system culminated in the firing of Secretary of the Navy Richard V. Spencer. Two ex-military officers pardoned by Trump appeared with the president at campaign events in 2019.

Congressmen

Trump issued pardons to seven Republican congressmen convicted of crimes: Chris Collins, Duncan D. Hunter, Steve Stockman, Rick Renzi, Robin Hayes, Mark Siljander, and Randall "Duke" Cunningham. Trump also granted clemency to at least ten healthcare executives and doctors convicted in large-scale Medicare fraud schemes. The National Health Care Anti-Fraud Association criticized Trump's pardons to executives who orchestrated massive Medicare frauds.

Wealthy individuals

Many wealthy individuals paid tens of thousands of dollars to former advisors to Trump for them to lobby Trump to grant pardons, bypassing the review process of the Office of the Pardon Attorney. Trump former personal lawyer John M. Dowd was hired by a number of convicts to lobby Trump for clemency, taking advantage of his direct access to Trump's White House Counsel's Office. Matt Schlapp, the chairman of the American Conservative Union and a lobbyist close to Trump administration, also lobbied Trump for clemency on behalf of their clients, as did Mark D. Cowan, another lobbyist allied with the administration. Trump's White House Counsel Pat Cipollone was officially in charge of the internal White House pardon process, but "key gatekeepers" included Trump's daughter Ivanka Trump and son-in-law Jared Kushner. Trump was also influenced by a "kitchen cabinet" that included Tolman; Americans for Prosperity chairman Mark Holden; Trump's former acting attorney general Matt Whitaker; Trump clemency recipient Alice Marie Johnson; and Trump's former attorney Pam Bondi, a former Florida Attorney General.

Chronology

From 2017 to 2019, the pardons included former Arizona sheriff Joe Arpaio; former Navy sailor Kristian Saucier, who was convicted of taking classified photographs of classified areas inside a submarine; Scooter Libby, a political aide to former vice president Dick Cheney; conservative commentator Dinesh D'Souza. He pardoned or reversed the sentences of three American soldiers convicted or accused of war crimes in Afghanistan or Iraq.

In November and December 2020, Trump pardoned four Blackwater guards convicted of killing Iraqi civilians in the 2007 Nisour Square massacre; white-collar criminals Michael Milken and Bernard Kerik; and daughter Ivanka's father-in-law Charles Kushner. He also pardoned five people convicted as a result of investigations into Russian interference in the 2016 presidential elections: Michael Flynn, George Papadopoulos, Alex van der Zwaan, Roger Stone, whose 40-month sentence for lying to Congress, witness tampering, and obstruction he had already commuted in July, and Paul Manafort.

In his last full day in office, Trump granted 143 pardons and commutations, including to his former chief strategist Steve Bannon, Trump fundraiser Elliott Broidy, and former Republican congressmen Rick Renzi, Robert Hayes, and Randall "Duke" Cunningham. He also commuted the sentences of dozens of people, including former Detroit mayor Kwame Kilpatrick and sports gambler Billy Walters; the latter had paid tens of thousands of dollars to former Trump attorney John M. Dowd to plead his case with Trump.

List of recipients of executive clemency from Trump

Pardons 
Trump issued a total of 143 pardons during his four years in office: one in 2017, six in 2018, eight in 2019, twelve in 2020, and 116 in January 2021.

Commutations 
Trump issued 94 commutations: one in 2017, four in 2018, two in 2019, five in 2020, and 83 in January 2021.

Miscellaneous 
In 2019, former Navy SEAL Eddie Gallagher was demoted following a July 2, 2019 court martial based on accusations that he had committed a war crime. Trump later reversed his demotion.

Responses

In October 2019, New York enacted the TRUST Act, which was signed into law by Andrew Cuomo. Among other things, the act closed a double jeopardy provision of state law to allow state prosecutors to pursue charges for violations of New York law against individuals pardoned by the president for a violation of federal law. The New York legislation was aimed at Trump's use of the pardon power. New York state attorney general Letitia James, proposed the law after multiple former Trump associates were investigated in New York state.  James' office has been investigating the finances of Trump and the Trump Organization. Upon passage of the law, James said that "We have a responsibility to ensure that individuals who commit crimes under New York state law are held accountable for those crimes. This critical new law closes a gaping loophole that could have allowed any president to abuse the presidential pardon power by unfairly granting a pardon to a family member or close associate and possibly allow that individual to evade justice altogether."

See also 
 Article Two of the United States Constitution
 Federal pardons in the United States
 List of people granted executive clemency by Barack Obama
 List of people pardoned by Bill Clinton
 List of people pardoned by George W. Bush
 List of people pardoned or granted clemency by the president of the United States

References

External links 
 Clemency Statistics by President, U.S. Office of the Pardon Attorney
 Commutations granted by President Trump , U.S. Office of the Pardon Attorney
 White House Statement on January 19, 2021 Pardons and Communtations

People pardoned by Donald Trump
People pardoned by Donald Trump
Pardoned by Trump
People pardoned
+Trump, Donald
Trump administration controversies
Executive clemency